John Howard Pugh (June 23, 1827 – April 30, 1905), was an American physician and Republican Party politician who represented New Jersey's 2nd congressional district in the United States House of Representatives for one term from 1877 to 1879.

Early life and career
Born in Unionville, Chester County, Pennsylvania, Pugh attended the common schools and the Friends' School, Westtown, Pennsylvania.

He taught school in Marietta, Pennsylvania, in 1847.

He graduated from the University of Pennsylvania School of Medicine in 1852, and began the practice of his profession in Bristol, Pennsylvania, that year. 
He moved to Burlington, New Jersey, in 1854 and continued the practice of medicine.

During the Civil War, he served as a physician without compensation at the United States general hospital in Beverly, New Jersey.

He served as president of the Mechanics' National Bank of Burlington for thirty-six years.

House of Representatives
Pugh was elected as a Republican to the Forty-fifth Congress, serving in office from March 4, 1877 – March 3, 1879, but was an unsuccessful candidate for reelection in 1878 to the Forty-sixth Congress.

Retirement and death
After leaving Congress, he resumed the practice of medicine, and served as member of the State board of education.

He died in Burlington, New Jersey, April 30, 1905, and was interred in Saint Mary's Episcopal Churchyard in Burlington.

References

External links

John Howard Pugh at The Political Graveyard

 

1827 births
1905 deaths
People from East Marlborough Township, Pennsylvania
American people of Welsh descent
Physicians from New Jersey
People from Burlington, New Jersey
Perelman School of Medicine at the University of Pennsylvania alumni
Union Army surgeons
Republican Party members of the United States House of Representatives from New Jersey
Westtown School alumni
19th-century American politicians
Military personnel from Pennsylvania
Military personnel from New Jersey